Poison ivy is a common name for Toxicodendron radicans, a poisonous plant, and two other poisonous plant species.

Poison ivy or Poison Ivy may also refer to:

Plants
 Toxicodendron radicans, (eastern poison ivy), a North American shrub or vine
 Toxicodendron rydbergii (western poison ivy), a North American shrub
 Smodingium argutum (African poison ivy), a southern African shrub or tree

Film and television
 La môme vert-de-gris or Poison Ivy, a 1953 French film by Bernard Borderie, based on Peter Cheyney's novel
 Poison Ivy (film series), an American erotic thriller film series
 Poison Ivy (1992 film), the first in the series
 Poison Ivy (1985 film), an American comedy television film
 "Poison Ivy" (Gossip Girl), a 2007 episode of Gossip Girl
 "Poison Ivy" (Law & Order), a 1990 episode of Law & Order
 Ivy Tilsley or Poison Ivy, a character from Coronation Street

Literature
 Poison Ivy (character), a character of the DC Universe
 Poison Ivy, a 1937 novel by Peter Cheyney that was adapted as a 1953 French film

Comic books
 Poison Ivy: Cast Shadows, a 2004 DC Comics one-shot
 Poison Ivy: Cycle of Life and Death, a 2016 DC Comics series
 Poison Ivy: Thorns, a 2021 DC Comics graphic novel
 Poison Ivy (2022 comic book), a 2022 DC Comics series

Music
 Poison Ivy (musician) (born 1953), American musician and co-founder of the Cramps
 "Poison Ivy" (song), a 1959 Leiber/Stoller song
 "Poison Ivy", a Mel London song recorded in 1954 by Willie Mabon
 "Poison Ivy", a 1963 The Hollies song from The Hollies - The Essential Collection
 "Poison Ivy", a 1989 Faster Pussycat song from Wake Me When It's Over
 "Poison Ivy", a 2004 Von Bondies song from Pawn Shoppe Heart
 "Poison Ivy", a 2004 Rita Lee song from 3001
 "Poison Ivy", a 2009 Jonas Brothers song from Lines, Vines and Trying Times

Other uses
 Ivy Lee or Poison Ivy (1877–1934), a pioneer in public relations and an employee of John D. Rockefeller's
 PoisonIvy (Trojan), a type of computer malware

See also
 Ivy